The Athletics at the 2016 Summer Paralympics – Men's 5000 metres T54 event at the 2016 Paralympic Games took place on 11 September 2016, at the Estádio Olímpico João Havelange.

Heats

Heat 1 
18:04 9 September 2016:

Heat 2 
18:19 9 September 2016:

Final 
10:15 11 September 2016:

Notes

Athletics at the 2016 Summer Paralympics
2016 in men's athletics